Allende Municipality is one of the 38 municipalities of Coahuila, in north-eastern Mexico. The municipal seat lies at Allende. The municipality covers an area of 198.7 km².

Demographics
As of 2005, the municipality had a total population of 20,153.

Government

Municipal presidents

References

Municipalities of Coahuila